Azimuth is the debut album by British jazz trio Azimuth featuring trumpeter Kenny Wheeler, vocalist Norma Winstone, and pianist John Taylor recorded in 1977 and released on the ECM label.

Reception

The AllMusic review by Michael G. Nastos awarded the album 4½ stars calling the compositions "deep improvisations, communicative and spiritual".

The authors of the Penguin Guide to Jazz Recordings wrote that Winstone's voice "floats with a characteristic balance between freedom and control over Taylor's minimalistic piano figures. Any doubts that these are jazz-trained and jazz-centred performers are immediately dispelled." They described the title track as "a grand acoustic edifice that constantly reveals new areas of interest."

A reviewer for Aquarium Drunkard wrote: "Taylor's arpeggiated synthesizers provide the pulsing backdrop for the majority of these tracks with Winstone and Wheeler floating and weaving through the space above with improvisational interplay akin to a dance. 'The Tunnel', one of two tracks with actual poetry, has Winstone singing of the 'darkness into blackness, flying along on the rhythm track', perhaps describing the dark, reflective space the trio beautifully explore and inhabit on this ambient jazz classic."

Tyran Grillo, writing for Between Sound and Space, called the album "an altogether fascinating mosaic of atmospheres."

Track listing
All compositions by John Taylor & Norma Winstone

 "Sirens' Song" - 4:13
 "O" - 6:49
 "Azimuth" - 12:18
 "The Tunnel" - 9:17 
 "Greek Triangle" - 2:05
 "Jacob" - 8:47

Personnel
Azimuth
John Taylor — piano, synthesizer
Kenny Wheeler — trumpet, flugelhorn
Norma Winstone — vocals

References

ECM Records albums
Azimuth (band) albums
1977 debut albums
Albums produced by Manfred Eicher